The Spain women's national tennis team represents Spain in Fed Cup tennis competition and are governed by the Real Federación Española de Tenis.  They currently compete in World Group II. The team Captain, as of 2018, is former professional player Anabel Medina Garrigues.

Current team
 Paula Badosa
 Garbiñe Muguruza
 Sara Sorribes Tormo
 Nuria Párrizas Díaz
 Rebeka Masarova

History
Spain competed in its first Fed Cup in 1972. They have won the Cup five times, and finished as runners-up six times.

External links
 
 

Billie Jean King Cup teams
Fed Cup